Greg King (born 1964) is an American author, best known for his biographies of prominent historical figures.

Biography
Born in 1964, King first became interested in royal history, particularly the Romanov Dynasty, at the age of ten.

Reviews 
A review in the Manhattan (Kansas) Mercury praised King's books about the sinking of the Andrea Doria and the Lusitania as works of historical non-fiction which provide the reader with a "clearer understanding of the causes" of these tragedies.

Publications 
 The Last Empress: The Life and Times of Alexandra Feodorovna, Empress of Russia, 1994
 The Mad King: The Life and Times of Ludwig II of Bavaria, 1996
 The Man Who Killed Rasputin: Prince Felix Youssoupov and the Murder That Helped Bring Down the Russian Empire, 1996
 The Duchess of Windsor: The Uncommon Life of Wallis Simpson, 1999
 Sharon Tate and the Manson murders, 2000
 The Fate of the Romanovs, co-authored with Penny Wilson, 2003
 The Court of the Last Tsar: Pomp, Power and Pageantry in the Reign of Nicholas II, 2006
 Gilded Prism: The Konstantinovichi Grand Dukes & the Last Years of the Romanov Dynasty, with Penny Wilson, 2006
 Twilight of Splendor: The Court of Queen Victoria During Her Diamond Jubilee Year, 2007
 A Season of Splendor: The Court of Mrs Astor in Gilded Age New York, 2008
 The Resurrection of the Romanovs: Anastasia, Anna Anderson, and the World's Greatest Royal Mystery, with Penny Wilson, 2010
 The Assassination of the Archduke: Sarajevo 1914 and the Romance That Changed the World, with Sue Woolmans, St. Martin's Press, 2013
Lusitania: Triumph, Tragedy, and the End of the Edwardian Age, with Penny Wilson, St. Martin's Press, 2015
Twilight of Empire: The Tragedy at Mayerling and the End of the Habsburgs, St. Martin's Press, 2017
The Last Voyage of the Andrea Doria: The Sinking of the World's Most Glamorous Ship, with Penny Wilson, St. Martin's Press, 2020

References

1964 births
American biographers
Living people